Akhbar ul-Usbu'a ('News of the Week') was a weekly newspaper published in Sudan between 1966 and 1970. It was issued by Awad Biraid. The newspaper was closely linked to the Sudanese Communist Party, and provided the Sudanese communists with a legal press after their party and main organ (al-Midan) had been banned.

References

1966 establishments in Sudan
1970 disestablishments in Sudan
Publications established in 1966
Publications disestablished in 1970
Defunct newspapers published in Sudan
Arabic communist newspapers
Defunct weekly newspapers
Communism in Sudan